Fluindione is a vitamin K antagonist.

References

Fluoroarenes
Indandiones